Gujan-Mestras is a commune in the Gironde department in southwestern France. It is twinned with Santa María de Cayón, Spain

Population

Geography
Gujan-Mestras is located in the southern part of the Arcachon bay. It is considered a major regional center for oyster farming, and is home to seven ports, which are from west to east:
The Port of La Hume which focuses both on oyster farming and yachting,
The Port of Meyran,
The Port of Gujan,
The Port of Larros which offers a promenade pier and is an active center for shipbuilding, 
The Port of the Canal,
The Port of La Barbotière, a major oyster farming center close to the Technical High School for Maritime Science and Technologies
The Port of La Mole which has neither been dredged nor used due to its difficult topography. From the former windmill bordering the port, only a millstone has withstood time. It gave its name to the Port of La Mole, “mole” meaning millstone in Gascon.

Neighbourhing communes 
Gujan-Mestras is surrounded by three communes. It is west of Le Teich, east of La Teste-de-Buch and north of Sanguinet.

Transports 
The TER Nouvelle-Aquitaine from Arcachon to Bordeaux has two stops in Gujan-Mestras (respectively named La Hume and Gujan-Mestras). The city is otherwise served by lines 4 to 7 of the Baïa bus network, the local public transport system of the Arcachon Bay which links the Dune of Pilat to Facture-Biganos. Nearest airport is Bordeaux–Mérignac Airport, around 50 km away.

See also
Communes of the Gironde department

References

Communes of Gironde